Salvia melaleuca is a perennial undershrub that is endemic to the north central region of the Eastern Cordillera in Colombia. It is a close relative of S. rubescens, with a villous and much larger corolla than that species.

Subspecies
It is divided into two subspecies: S. melaleuca subsp. melaleuca and S. melaleuca subsp. totensis. Subsp. melaleuca has leaves that are smooth on the upper surface, and racemes with 6–10 verticillasters that are up to 25 cm long. Subsp. totensis has leaves that are hairy on the upper surface, with racemes that typically have 3–5 verticillasters, growing to 10 cm long.

References

melaleuca
Endemic flora of Colombia